Pain Velayat Rural District is a rural district (dehestan) in the Central District of Taybad County, Razavi Khorasan Province, Iran. At the 2006 census, its population was 5,689, in 1,209 families.  The rural district has 15 villages.

References 

Rural Districts of Razavi Khorasan Province
Taybad County